James Joseph Pallotta (born March 13, 1958) is an American  billionaire businessman. In 2009, he founded Raptor Group, a private investment company. Prior to forming Raptor, Pallotta was vice chairman at Tudor Investment Corporation. He was co-owner and chairman of the Italian football club A.S. Roma from 2011 to 2020; co-owner and executive board member of the National Basketball Association's Boston Celtics, and co-owner of esports franchise Fnatic.

Early life
Pallotta was born in 1958 in Boston to a mother from Canosa di Puglia, Apulia and a father from Calabria, Italy. Along with sisters Carla and Christine Pallotta, he was raised in Boston's Italian north end neighborhood. His sisters own and operate NEBO Cucina & Enoteca in Boston's financial district. Pallotta earned a BBA at University of Massachusetts Amherst and an MBA at Northeastern University.

Professional background

Raptor Group
Pallotta founded Raptor Group, a private investment company with offices in Boston, New York City, Miami, London, and Abu Dhabi. Raptor focuses on various industries including  sports, consumer, technology, media, entertainment, and financial services.

A.S. Roma
Pallotta, along with three other American investors (Thomas R. DiBenedetto, Michael Ruane and Richard D'Amore) acquired Serie A football club A.S. Roma in 2011.

After becoming one of the owners in 2011, in August 2012, Pallotta became the chairman of club, succeeding Thomas R. DiBenedetto, and becoming the 23rd in the club's history. During Pallotta’s ownership, the club would primarily engage in capitalizing on the sale of its players, leading AS Roma to obtain over half a billion in capital gains on player trading operations, which earned Pallotta the nickname of “King of capital gains”. This financial approach to football, coupled with one of AS Roma's longest period without winning any trophies, as well as what many considered an undeserved dismissal of AS Roma icons Francesco Totti and Daniele De Rossi, lead to a serious clash with the fans and the only worldwide protest in AS Roma history, with disapproving banners in several remote parts of the world.

In December 2019, Pallotta was in final negotiations to sell the team for $872 million, to American businessman Dan Friedkin.
 In August 2020, Friedkin signed the preliminary contract to agree to pay $591 million to Pallotta, the main shareholder of Roma. As the club's balance sheets later revealed, AS Roma had tremendous debt and seriously risked bankruptcy before having to be transferred to a new ownership in 2020.

Tudor Investment Corporation
Prior to Raptor Group, Pallotta was a vice chairman and partner at Tudor Investment Corporation.

Initiatives
Pallotta is a member of the board of trustees for the Santa Fe Institute and the Board of Trustees for Northeastern University. Pallotta serves on the board of directors for New Profit Inc. as well as the board of advisors for Tulco, LLC. He is also a member of the advisory council for the MIT Media Lab and the external advisory committee for the Center for Brains, Minds and Machines (CBMM) at MIT.

References 

1958 births
Living people
People from North End, Boston
American people of Italian descent
People of Calabrian descent
People of Apulian descent
A.S. Roma chairmen and investors
Businesspeople from Massachusetts
Isenberg School of Management alumni
University of Massachusetts Amherst alumni
Northeastern University alumni